Deep Hollow is a tributary of West Branch Fishing Creek in Luzerne County, Pennsylvania, in the United States. Wild trout naturally reproduce in the stream. The surficial geology in the area mainly features bedrock consisting of sandstone and shale, as well as a small amount of Boulder Colluvium and alluvium.

Course
Deep Hollow begins in a valley on a plateau in Davidson Township. It flows south-southeast for several tenths of a mile and its valley becomes much deeper. The stream then turns south-southwest for a few tenths of a mile. It then turns south-southeast again, crossing Fishing Creek Road and reaching its confluence with West Branch Fishing Creek.

Geography and geology

Nearly all of the surficial geology in the valley of Deep Hollow is on bedrock consisting of sandstone and shale. However, near its mouth, there is an area of alluvium and Boulder Colluvium. Alluvium contains stratified sand, silt, and gravel, as well as some boulders. Boulder Colluvium mainly contains boulders made of quartz, sandstone, or conglomerate.

The Pennsylvania Game Commission has a permit to maintain a bridge over Deep Hollow. It is a wood plank bridge with stone abutment walls.

Watershed and biology
The stream is entirely within the United States Geological Survey quadrangle of Elk Grove.

Wild trout naturally reproduce in Deep Hollow from its headwaters downstream to its mouth.

History and etymology
Deep Hollow was entered into the Geographic Names Information System on August 2, 1979. Its identifier in the Geographic Names Information System is 1173064. The stream is unnamed and instead takes the name of the valley that it flows through.

See also
Shingle Mill Run, next tributary of West Branch Fishing Creek going downstream
Laurel Run (West Branch Fishing Creek), next tributary of West Branch Fishing Creek going upstream
List of tributaries of Fishing Creek (North Branch Susquehanna River)
List of rivers of Pennsylvania

References

Rivers of Sullivan County, Pennsylvania
Tributaries of Fishing Creek (North Branch Susquehanna River)
Rivers of Pennsylvania